Casca or CASCA may refer to:


Arts and entertainment
 Casca (Rome character), a character in the HBO television series
 Casca (series), a series of novels by Barry Sadler
 A character in the anime and manga series Berserk

Places
 Casca, Rio Grande do Sul, Brazil, a municipality
 Casca District, Mariscal Luzuriaga, Peru
 Rio Casca, Minas Gerais, Brazil, a municipality

Other uses
 168358 Casca, a minor planet
 Canadian Astronomical Society
 Casca (grape), another name for the wine grape Mourvèdre
 Contemporary Art Centre of South Australia, now art of ACE Open, Adelaide, Australia
 Servilius Casca, one of the assassins of Julius Caesar

See also
 Da Casca River, Mato Grosso, Brazil
 Cascas, a town in La Libertad, Peru